Johanne Samueline Pedersen (15 March 1887 – 16 September 1961) was a Norwegian politician for the Labour Party.

She was born in Innvik.

She was elected to the Norwegian Parliament from Hedmark in 1945, and was re-elected on one occasion. She had previously served in the position of deputy representative during the term 1937–1945.

Pedersen was a member of Brandval municipality council from 1934 to 1940 and 1945 to 1951.

References

1887 births
1961 deaths
Labour Party (Norway) politicians
Members of the Storting
Women members of the Storting
20th-century Norwegian women politicians
20th-century Norwegian politicians